Plinth Peak, sometimes called Plinth Mountain, is the highest satellite cone of the Mount Meager massif, and one of four overlapping volcanic cones which together form a large volcanic complex in the Garibaldi Volcanic Belt of the Canadian Cascade Arc. It is one of the most recently formed volcanic formations of the Mount Meager massif.

Plinth Peak is the highest volcanic peak of the Mount Meager massif. Located on the steep north flank of Plinth is the remnant of an inner crater wall that was destroyed by a lateral blast during a period of volcanic activity about 2,350 years ago.

See also
 List of volcanoes in Canada
 List of Cascade volcanoes
 Devastator Peak
 Pylon Peak
 Capricorn Mountain
 Mount Job
 Plinth Assemblage
 Volcanism of Western Canada
 Geology of the Pacific Northwest

References

 Plinth Peak in the Canadian Mountain Encyclopedia.

Volcanoes of British Columbia
Two-thousanders of British Columbia
Mount Meager massif
Subduction volcanoes
Stratovolcanoes of Canada
Polygenetic volcanoes
Pleistocene volcanoes